Montanum is the neuter form of a Latin word meaning mountain (as an adjective).
It appears as the second element of species names as follows:

Animals
Altagonum montanum, ground beetle
Aspidodiadema montanum, sea urchin
Anthidium montanum, mason bee
Labicymbium montanum, sheet weaver (spider)
Leptobrachium montanum, amphibian
Psycharium montanum, moth
Rhagium montanum, beetle

Plants
Antidesma montanum, tree of the family Phyllanthaceae
Arthrophyllum montanum, synonym of Polyscias montana, ivy family
Asplenium montanum, fern, mountain spleenwort
Baliospermum montanum, red physic nut
Botrychium montanum, fern, mountain moonwort
Bulbophyllum montanum, orchid
Canistrum montanum, family Bromeliaceae
Cypripedium montanum, orchid, mountain lady's slipper
Epilobium montanum, broad-leaved willowherb
Erythronium montanum, white avalanche lily
Geum montanum, rose family
Hypericum montanum, pale St. John's-wort
Myoporum montanum, waterbush, Australian shrub
Lepidium montanum, mountain pepperwort
Sideroxylon montanum, family Sapotaceae
Platylobium montanum, Australian shrub
Sisyrinchium montanum, American blue-eyed grass
Spathiphyllum montanum, arum family
Symphionema montanum, Australian shrub
Trifolium montanum, bean family
Xanthophyllum montanum, tree of the family Polygalaceae
Leptospermum polygalifolium subsp. montanum, mountain tea tree

See also
Montanus (disambiguation)
Montana (disambiguation)